Vikla is a village in the Limassol District of Cyprus, located 4 km northeast of Kellaki. Vikla was formerly home to over 50 people, but has since been abandoned for decades. All buildings in Vikla except for a Church were burnt in a fire in 2005. The village however is the site of a golf course which was set up after Vikla was abandoned and is still being used today. Vikla is also visited once annually for a religious event held at the church.

References

Communities in Limassol District